Fjæreheia is a former quarry in Norway where a characteristic red granite was mined. Since 1993 Fjæreheia has been a theatre for both the plays of Ibsen and modern rock musicals.

Agder Theatre bought the quarry in 1995, and in summer 1999 built a new amphitheatre with 1000 seats. The quarry is a unique outdoors arena with good acoustics, and lies around 2 kilometers from Fjære church.

Since opening in 1999 there have been many different types of arrangement at Fjæreheia. Diverse productions have been staged, including musicals such as Jesus Christ Superstar, film presentations, readings of the poem "Terje Vigen" and rock concerts from acts such as A-ha, Vamp and Bjørn Eidsvåg.

Plays 
 Brand - 2006
 Emma -  2005
 Antigone - 2004
 Jesus Christ Superstar - 2001 and 2002
 Peer Gynt - 1998 and 2000
 Når vi døde vågner - 1996
 Catilina - 1993 and 1994

Upcoming Events 
 "Steinbrudduka" August 2013, a Nordic performing arts festival

External links 
Agder Teater
Steinbrudduka

Culture in Agder
Theatre in Norway